Pridorozhny is a rural locality (a khutor) in Veydelevsky District, Belgorod Oblast, Russia. The population was 58 as of 2010. There is 1 street.

Geography 
Pridorozhny is located 8 km east of Veydelevka (the district's administrative centre) by road. Privetny is the nearest rural locality.

References 

Rural localities in Veydelevsky District